ʿAbd al-Raḥmān ibn Samura (died  in Basra) was a general of the Rashidun caliphate and the succeeding Umayyad Caliphate, and caliphal governor of Sijistan in the 7th century CE.

Biography
According to Ibn Manzur, Ibn Samura was a Qurayshite. His father was Samura ibn Habib ibn Rabi'a ibn Abd Shams ibn Abd Manaf ibn Qusayy ibn Kilab.

Ibn Samura participated in the Battle of Mu'tah in 629. After Khalid ibn al-Walid managed to organize the safe retreat from the abortive battle, Khalid sent Ibn Samura in advance as a messenger to Medina, capital of the nascent Muslim state, to report the battle result to the Islamic prophet Muhammad.

By 652, he replaced Rabi ibn Ziyad al-Harithi as the governor of Sistan. 

During the Muslim conquest of Sistan, Ibn Samura was sent by governor of Basra, Abdallah ibn Amir to Sistan, and then initiated the Muslim conquest of Khorasan, where he first secured peace in a place named "land of al-Dawar".

Capture of Zamindawar (653 CE)
In 653-4 CE, an army of around 6,000 Arabs was led by Abd al-Rahman ibn Samura, and seized Rukhkhaj and Zamindawar. In the shrine of Zoon in Zamindawar, it is reported that Samura "broke off a hand of the idol and plucked out the rubies which were its eyes in order to persuade the marzbān of Sīstān" that the idol was worthless.  Samura explained to the marzbān: "my intention was to show you that this idol can do neither any harm nor good." Bost and Zabul submitted to the Arab invader by treaty in 656 CE.

It is then recorded by Abu Labid that when the army was trying to get their hands on the spoils of war, Ibn Samura stood up and warned them by narrating a hadith he heard from Muhammad that the Prophet forbade the seizing of spoils of war before it is distributed first according to the rule of Sharia. Then those who took the booty returned what they had taken, he then distributed it among them.

Then Ibn Samura sent the spoils of war to Abdullah ibn Amir. Bost (Sīstān) and Zabulistan submitted by a treaty of capitulation, also signed with the marzban of Kerman before the death of Caliph Uthman in 656. The Muslims soon lost these territories during the First Civil War (656-661).

Upon the caliph's death, he returned to Basra, where its governor Abdallah ibn Amir was dismissed by the new Caliph Ali. He joined Muawiyah I after the Battle of the Camel, and was sent as one of the envoys to Hasan ibn Ali in 661. Abdallah ibn Amir was reappointed as governor in Basra by Muawiyah, and Samura was sent along with Abd Allah ibn Khazim al-Sulami to restore Arab rule in eastern Khurasan and Sīstān. He introduced the office of ṣāḥeb al-šorṭa (chief of police) to Sīstān and built a mosque in Zaranj.

Capture of Kabul (665 CE)

The territories he had conquered had to be reclaimed by force or by treaty. He launched an expedition to Arachosia and Zabulistan, recovering Bust and other cities. Kabul was occupied in 665 CE after a siege of a few months. Kabul soon revolted but was reoccupied after a month-long siege. He managed to convert 12,000 inhabitants of Kabul to Islam before leaving the city according to Firishta. Muawiyah personally confirmed him as governor dependent on the caliph. Abd al-Rahman's capture and plunder of Kabul put an end to the rule of the Nezak Hun king Ghar-ilchi. The Nezak ruler was succeeded by the powerful Turk dynasty of the Turk Shahis: Barha Tegin, the first Turk Shahi ruler took the throne in 665-666 CE and soon recaptured the territory as far as Kandahar and Bost.

After Muawiyah deposed Samura from Sīstān in 665, he retired to Basra where the slaves he had brought from Kabul built a mosque in his house in the building style of Kabul. He died in Basra in 670.

References

Sources
 

7th-century military personnel
Generals of the Umayyad Caliphate
7th-century Arabs
Year of birth unknown
Year of death unknown